The 1902 New Hampshire gubernatorial election was held on November 4, 1902. Republican nominee Nahum J. Bachelder defeated Democratic nominee Henry F. Hollis with 53.19% of the vote.

General election

Candidates
Major party candidates
Nahum J. Bachelder, Republican
Henry F. Hollis, Democratic

Other candidates
John C. Berry, Prohibition
Michael H. O'Neil, Socialist
Alonzo Elliott, Independent
George Howie, People's

Results

References

1902
New Hampshire
Gubernatorial